Liangpi is a Chinese dish composed of cold skin noodles made from wheat or rice flour. It is a specialty dish originating from the cuisine of Shaanxi Province, but has now spread throughout all of China. In northwestern areas of China, it is often called liangpi zi. Although liangpi is served cold, they are served in every season, including winter.

Preparation
Liangpi literally means cold skin, although it contains no animal products. There are several ways of making liangpi:

First, wheat or rice flour is turned into a soft dough by adding water and a little salt. Then, the dough is put in a bowl, water is added and the dough has to be "rinsed" until the water is saturated with starch from the dough, turning into a muddy white color. The remainder of the dough is now removed, and the bowl is left to rest overnight at a cool place to allow the dissolved starch to precipitate.

The following day, there will be a kind of starch-paste on the bottom of the bowl, with a more or less clear liquid on top, which has to be discarded. Once the liquid has been removed, a small amount of the paste can then be poured into a flat plate or tray, and spread evenly in a thin layer. The whole plate is placed into a large pot full of boiling water, where it is steamed for a couple of minutes, and the resulting "pancake" cut into long pieces vaguely resembling noodles.

Types

Hanzhong liangpi 
Hanzhong liangpi or Hanzhong mianpi, named for the city of Hanzhong in southwestern Shaanxi, are steamed liangpi with garlic and hot chili oil. Unlike other places, it is often served hot rather than cold.

Majiang liangpi 

Majiang liangpi are liangpi garnished with julienned cucumber and a sauce made of salt, vinegar, hot chili oil and especially Chinese sesame paste, for which it is named.

Shaanxi gan mianpi  
Shaanxi gan mianpi (陕西岐山擀面皮 is another type of liangpi that tastes a bit firmer and looks darker in color compared to other liangpi. The process of making gan mianpi is quite laborious, including several repeated processes to separate gluten and starch by washing the dough in cold water a few times. After washing, mainly gluten is left in the dough, which can be solidified by boiling (called mianjin). The starch water is thickened by boiling as well, and then spread on a pan and further cooked as a pancake.

It is always served with mianjin (solidified gluten), cooked vinegar, hot chili oil, salt, mashed garlic in water, and bean sprouts.

See also
Liangfen
Chinese noodles
Rice noodles

References

External links
 New York Times - Let the Meals Begin: Finding Beijing in Flushing

Chinese noodle dishes
Cold noodles
Shaanxi cuisine